The Huawei IDEOS U8150 is a mobile phone manufactured by Huawei, inc.

It is rebranded as S31HW by EMOBILE in Japan. It is also renamed the T-Mobile Comet in the United States.

Features 
The U8150 features a 2.8-inch glass capacitive touchscreen. It also features a 3.16 megapixel fixed-focus camera, Bluetooth connectivity, built-in GPS/AGPS. A microSD slot is located under the phone's battery cover.

Physical buttons are the power button, a volume control on the side of the phone, a call start button, a navigation pad, and a call end button.

Notes

External links
Profile at gsmarena.com
Huawei

Android (operating system) devices
Huawei mobile phones
Mobile phones introduced in 2010
Discontinued smartphones